Pańska Dolina no longer exists. The village was liquidated during the Polish population transfers after World War II, when the Kresy macroregion was formally incorporated into the Soviet Union (as agreed at the Potsdam Conference of 1945). Pańska Dolina used to be located in Gmina Młynów, Powiat Dubno (county), of the Wołyń Voivodeship, before the Nazi German and Soviet invasions of Poland in September 1939. Its former location can be found near Mlyniv in Dubno Raion of present-day Ukraine.

World War II history

The village was one of several points of Polish defence against the OUN-UPA murderous raids during the wave of massacres of Poles in Volhynia between 1942 and 1945. The Polish self-defence unit represented mostly by Armia Krajowa managed to hold their position there till the arrival of the Red Army in 1944. The village offered protection to Polish and Jewish escapees from the area, provided food and shelter, and organised counter-attacks against the UPA attackers.

The list of Polish villages from the area that managed to defend themselves against the genocide being committed by the Ukrainian nationalists include: Pańska Dolina, Zaturce, Huta Stara, Zasmyki, Dąbrowa, Dederkały, Rybcza, Jagodzin-Rymacze, Przebraże (see Przebraże Defence), Rożyszcze, Antonówka Szepelska, Bielm-Spaszczyzna, Witoldówka, Ostróg; as well as Młynów, Kurdybań Warkowicki (no longer existing, similar to many of the aforementioned settlements), Lubomirka, Klewań, Rokitno, Budki Snowidowickie, and Osty. Many Polish villages were liquidated during the Polish population transfers.

References

  Leonard Urbanowicz,  Miejscowości powiatu DUBIEŃSKIEGO w województwie wołyńskim 
 Leszek Ubowski,  Organizacja i funkcjonowanie okręgu Okręg Wołyń, Wrocław 2007

History of Volyn Oblast
Former populated places in Ukraine
Massacres of Poles in Volhynia
Ukrainian Insurgent Army
War crimes committed by the Ukrainian Insurgent Army